Ball boys and ball girls, also known as ball kids, are individuals, usually human youths but sometimes dogs, who retrieve and supply balls for players or officials in sports such as association football, American football, bandy, cricket, tennis, baseball and basketball. Though non-essential, their activities help to speed up play by reducing the amount of inactive time.

Tennis

Due to the nature of the sport, quick retrieval of loose balls and delivery of the game balls to the servers are necessary for quick play in tennis. In professional tournaments, every court will have a trained squad of ball boys/girls with positionings and movements designed for maximum efficiency, while also not interfering with active play. As well as dealing with the game balls, ball boys/girls may also provide the players with other assistance, such as the delivery of towels and drinks.

Positions
 Nets are located on either side of the net to retrieve balls that are trapped by the net. Their job is to gather dead balls from the court and feed them to the bases after a point. This is usually done by rolling them alongside the court.
 Bases are located just off each corner (at either end of the baseline at either end of the court). Their job is to retrieve balls from the nets and then feed balls to the server.

Feeding
Feeding is how the ball boys and girls give the balls to the players. At different tournaments, they use different techniques for feeding. At some tournaments, bases have both arms in the air, feeding the balls with one arm; at others, they have one arm in the air which they feed the balls and the other arm behind their back. When feeding the ball, they must also be aware of a player's preference. Most players accept the standard, which is for the ball boy or girl to gently toss the ball (from the position with their arms extended upwards) such that it bounces one time then to the proper height for the player to catch the ball easily.

Hiring
There are various methods for selecting the ball boys and girls for a tournament.  In many tournaments, such as Wimbledon and the Queen's Club Championships, they are picked from or apply through schools, where they are selected by tournaments and they have to go through a number of selections and tests.  In some other tournaments, such as the Nottingham Open, Australian Open and the US Open, positions are advertised and there are open try-outs.

Applicants are required to pass a physical ability assessment. In addition to fitness and stamina, the abilities to concentrate and remain alert are essential.

Association football

High-profile association football matches may employ ball boys to avoid long delays when a game ball leaves the pitch and its immediate vicinity. Typically positioned behind advertising boards surrounding the pitch, ball boys will try to be in possession of a spare ball at all times, so that this can be given to the players prior to the loose ball being retrieved. 

Methods for selecting ball boys vary between grounds. On occasion, away teams have complained about perceived favour of ball boys towards home sides.

Association football ball boys hit the headlines in England in a 2013 Capital One Cup match when Eden Hazard, a member of the away team, which was trailing at the time, appeared to kick at an apparently time-wasting ball boy Charlie Morgan who was lying on top of the ball. Hazard was subsequently sent off for violent conduct and suspended for three games. It was later revealed that the ball boy had tweeted the day before that he had intended to waste time.

Baseball

Ball kids are stationed in out-of-play areas near the first and third base foul lines to retrieve out-of-play baseballs. They should not be confused with batboys and batgirls, who remain in or near a team's dugout and the home plate area, primarily to tend to a team's baseball bats.

As ball kids are stationed on the field, albeit in foul territory, they can occasionally interfere with play; such events are governed by Rule 6.01(d), the main point of which is that if the interference is unintentional, any live ball remains alive and in play.

Since 1992, the San Francisco Giants have employed older men as "balldudes", instead of the traditional youths. In 1993, Corinne Mullane became the first "balldudette", and she and her daughter Molly, who began working as a balldudette in the 2000s, have since been included in the National Baseball Hall of Fame as the first mother-daughter ball-retrieving duo in baseball.

Cricket
Ball boys are stationed around the field just outside the boundary to retrieve any balls struck into the spectator stands or to the boundary rope. In India, disabled people are not allowed to be ball-boys anymore after a controversy occurred in 2017, after criticism of the Board of Control for Cricket in India surrounding the appearance of a polio-afflicted fan who had been serving as a ball-boy for a few years.

See also

Water boy

References

External links 

 

Sports occupations and roles
Terminology used in multiple sports
Association football terminology
Basketball terminology
Rugby league terminology
Rugby union terminology
Tennis terminology